Hal Hunter may refer to:
 Hal Hunter (fullback), American football player
 Hal Hunter (American football, born 1932) (1932–2014), American football coach
 Hal Hunter (American football, born 1959), American football coach

See also
Harold Hunter (disambiguation)